Clare Hall is a village in Saint John Parish, Antigua and Barbuda.

Demographics 
Clare Hall has four enumeration districts.

 31900 Upper Clare Hall 
 32000 Clare Hall-Central
 32100 Clare Hall-Christian Union 
 32200 Clare Hall School

Census Data (2011) 
Source:

References 

Populated places in Antigua and Barbuda
Saint John Parish, Antigua and Barbuda